Beef is the meat from cattle.

Beef may also refer to:
 "Beef", a song by Royce da 5'9" from Death Is Certain
 "Beef", an episode of The Protector
 "Beef", nickname of English golfer Andrew Johnston (golfer)
 "Beef" quarrying term for fibrous calcite veins found within some types of mudstones
 "Beef" slang for a public or personal feud with another person, popularly used in hip hop music
 Beef (band), a Dutch reggae fusion band
 Beef (comics), a character in the Marvel universe
 Beef Creek, a stream in South Dakota
 Beef (film), a 2003 documentary film about hip hop feuds, also called beefs
 Beef (TV series), a 2023 Netflix comedy drama series
 Beef (Nitro Girl), a stage name of professional wrestler Rhonda Sing with the Nitro Girls
 Big Explosives Experimental Facility
 British Energy Efficiency Federation
 "B.E.E.F.", a song by Reks from the album The Greatest X